Kim Dae-eun (born September 17, 1984) is a South Korean gymnast.

Kim attended the Korea National Sport University. He won the silver medal in the men's artistic individual all-around at the 2004 Athens Olympics, and his loss to American Paul Hamm by a 0.012 margin was the closest in men's Olympic all-around history, though tied by Tatiana Gutsu's win over Shannon Miller in 1992. At the 2006 Asian Games, Kim tied with Yang Wei of China for the gold medal on parallel bars and was part of the South Korean team that won the bronze medal in the team event. Kim tied with Mitja Petkovšek from Slovenia for the gold medal on the parallel bars at the 2007 World Artistic Gymnastics Championships.

References

External links
 
 
 

1984 births
Living people
South Korean male artistic gymnasts
Gymnasts at the 2004 Summer Olympics
Gymnasts at the 2008 Summer Olympics
Olympic gymnasts of South Korea
Olympic silver medalists for South Korea
World champion gymnasts
Medalists at the World Artistic Gymnastics Championships
Sportspeople from South Jeolla Province
Olympic medalists in gymnastics
Asian Games medalists in gymnastics
Gymnasts at the 2002 Asian Games
Gymnasts at the 2006 Asian Games
Korea National Sport University alumni
Medalists at the 2004 Summer Olympics
Asian Games gold medalists for South Korea
Asian Games silver medalists for South Korea
Asian Games bronze medalists for South Korea
Medalists at the 2002 Asian Games
Medalists at the 2006 Asian Games
Universiade medalists in gymnastics
Universiade gold medalists for South Korea
Universiade silver medalists for South Korea
Medalists at the 2003 Summer Universiade
21st-century South Korean people